Araoz is a variation of the Spanish Basque name Araotz which means "cold valley" in ancient Basque. The valley and municipality of Araotz (Araoz) has existed for more than 800 years.  Basque surname, with Other variations of Araotz are Araoz, Arauz, Arautz and Araos. and may also refer to:

 Alejandro Fernández de Araoz y de la Devesa (1894–1970), Spanish lawyer and banker
 Alvin J. Araoz (1987-), American Entrepreneur
 Antero Flores Aráoz (1942–), Peruvian lawyer and politician
 Arturo Tabera Araoz (1903–1975), Roman Catholic cardinal from Spain
 Bernabé Aráoz (1776–1824), Argentine politician
 Claudio Fernández-Aráoz, Argentine business theorist and author
 Daniel Aráoz (disambiguation), several people
 Diego Aráoz (1771–1840), Argentine soldier and politician
 Duberty Aráoz (1920–?), Bolivian footballer active in the 1950s
 German Araoz, Argentine professional rugby union player
 Gregorio Aráoz de Lamadrid (1795–1857), Argentine military leader
 Mercedes Aráoz (1961–), Peruvian politician
 Pedro Miguel Aráoz (1759–1832), Argentine statesman and priest

References

Basque-language surnames